TQM or tqm may refer to :
 T.Q.M., album by Spanish singer Melody (2003)
 Turumsa language ISO 639:3 code
 Total quality management